Podi is a village in the municipality of Herceg Novi, Montenegro.

Demographics
According to the 2003 census, the town had a population of 1,199.

According to the 2011 census, its population was 1,358.

References

Populated places in Herceg Novi Municipality
Serb communities in Montenegro